Trường Xuân may refer to several places in Vietnam, including:

Trường Xuân, Quảng Nam, a ward of Tam Kỳ.
Trường Xuân, Cần Thơ, a rural commune of Thới Lai District.
Trường Xuân, Đắk Nông, a rural commune of Đăk Song District.
Trường Xuân, Đồng Tháp, a rural commune of Tháp Mười District.
Trường Xuân, Quảng Bình, a rural commune of Quảng Ninh District.
Trường Xuân, Thanh Hóa, a rural commune of Thọ Xuân District.

See also
Trường Xuân A, a rural commune of Thới Lai District, Cần Thơ
Trường Xuân B, a rural commune of Thới Lai District, Cần Thơ
Changchun (Vietnamese: Trường Xuân)